The 2016 United States Senate election in Alabama was held on November 8, 2016, to elect a member of the United States Senate to represent the State of Alabama, concurrently with the 2016 U.S. presidential election, as well as other elections to the United States Senate in other states and elections to the United States House of Representatives and various state and local elections.

Incumbent Republican Senator Richard Shelby won re-election to a sixth term in office. The primaries were held on March 1. Ron Crumpton, a  marijuana legalization activist, was the Democratic nominee. Shelby won re-election with 63.96% of the vote. Despite an overwhelming victory statewide, this marks Shelby’s first race as either a Republican or Democrat in which he has failed to carry Jefferson County (home of Birmingham, the state’s largest city). In Jefferson, Crumpton took 51.99% (156,574 votes) to Senator Shelby’s 47.86% (144,136 votes), this shift is due in part to increase of Democratic support in urban core areas across the nation.

Background
Shelby was first elected to the Senate in 1986 as a Democrat and was easily re-elected in 1992 as such. He switched his party affiliation to Republican on November 9, 1994, one day after the Republicans won control of both houses in the midterm elections. He won his first full term as a Republican in 1998 by a large margin and faced no significant opposition in 2004 or 2010.

Republican primary
Following the divisive Republican primary in Mississippi ahead of the 2014 election in which Senator Thad Cochran was almost defeated, it had been speculated that Shelby could also face a Tea Party primary challenger, due to his lengthy tenure and support for federal largesse. However, that did not happen, in part due to his large campaign war chest, which stood at $19.4 million as of September 2015. If Shelby had decided to retire, numerous high-profile Alabama Republicans were speculated to run, including U.S. Representatives Robert Aderholt, Mo Brooks, Bradley Byrne, Gary Palmer, Martha Roby, and Mike Rogers, State Treasurer Young Boozer, State Speaker Mike Hubbard, Lieutenant Governor Kay Ivey, State Senate President Pro Tempore Del Marsh, Secretary of State John Merrill, U.S. Appeals Court Judge William H. Pryor Jr., former Governor Bob Riley, and Attorney General Luther Strange.  Shelby announced in January 2015 that he would run for re-election.

Candidates

Declared
 Richard Shelby, incumbent U.S. Senator since 1987
 Marcus Bowman, Uber driver
 John Martin, pilot and candidate for AL-02 in 2008
 Jonathan McConnell, businessman
 Shadrack McGill, former State Senator and candidate for Jackson County Revenue Commissioner in 2014

Endorsements

Polling

Primary results

Democratic primary

Candidates

Declared
 Ron Crumpton, marijuana legalization activist and nominee for the State Senate in 2014
 Charles Nana, process engineer

Failed to qualify
 Reginald Hill, candidate for Huntsville School Board in 2012 and write-in candidate for AL-05 in 2014

Declined
 Stephen Black, non-profit executive
 Bobby Bright, former U.S. Representative
 Parker Griffith, former U.S. Representative, and nominee for Governor of Alabama in 2014
 Sue Bell Cobb, former Chief Justice of the Supreme Court of Alabama
 Marsha Folsom, businesswoman, former First Lady of Alabama, and nominee for Alabama's 4th congressional district in 2000
 Walt Maddox, Mayor of Tuscaloosa
 Terri Sewell, U.S. Representative (running for re-election)

Primary results

General election

Candidates
 Richard Shelby (R), incumbent Senator
 Ron Crumpton (D), marijuana legalization activist and nominee for the State Senate in 2014
 Charles Nana (D) (write-in), process engineer (previously sought the Democratic nomination)

Predictions

Polling
{| class="wikitable" style="font-size:90%;"
|- valign= bottom
! Poll source
! Date(s)administered
! Samplesize
! Margin oferror
! style="width:100px;"| RichardShelby (R)
! style="width:100px;"| RonCrumpton (D)
! Undecided
|-
| SurveyMonkey
| align=center| November 1–7, 2016
| align=center| 1,131
| align=center| ± 4.6%
|  align=center| 57%
| align=center| 38%
| align=center| 5%
|-
| SurveyMonkey
| align=center| October 31 – November 6, 2016
| align=center| 971
| align=center| ± 4.6%
|  align=center| 58%
| align=center| 37%
| align=center| 5%
|-
| SurveyMonkey
| align=center| October 28 – November 3, 2016
| align=center| 722
| align=center| ± 4.6%
|  align=center| 57%
| align=center| 38%
| align=center| 5%
|-
| SurveyMonkey
| align=center| October 27 – November 2, 2016
| align=center| 621
| align=center| ± 4.6%
|  align=center| 58%
| align=center| 37%
| align=center| 5%
|-
| SurveyMonkey
| align=center| October 26 – November 1, 2016
| align=center| 503
| align=center| ± 4.6%
|  align=center| 56%
| align=center| 40%
| align=center| 4%
|-
| SurveyMonkey
| align=center| October 25–31, 2016
| align=center| 485
| align=center| ± 4.6%
|  align=center| 60%
| align=center| 36%
| align=center| 4%
|-
| Google Consumer Surveys
| align=center| October 18–20, 2016
| align=center| 474
| align=center| ± 4.2%
|  align=center| 71%
| align=center| 26%
| align=center| 3%

Results

References

External links
Official campaign websites
Richard Shelby (R) for Senate
Ron Crumpton (D) for Senate

2016
Alabama
United States Senate